Julio Rodolfo Neme Moreno (born 18 September 1964) is a Uruguayan football manager and former player.

Playing career
Born in Montevideo, Neme played for Sud América, Rampla Juniors, Bella Vista, Liverpool Montevideo and Peñarol Durazno as a senior. He retired in 1991, aged 27.

Coaching career
Shortly after retiring, Neme took up coaching and began his career in 1992 with college side Club Sirio Maeso. His first managerial experience occurred in 1998, while in charge of Avenida.

He was the assistant manager of Defensor Sporting between 2006 and 2007, and later returned to Bella Vista.

In 2012, Neme began working with Martín Lasarte, being his assistant at Universidad Católica. He continued working with Lasarte in the following years, at Universidad de Chile, Nacional Montevideo and Al Ahly.

On 8 January 2020, Neme was appointed manager of Deportes Linares in the Chilean Segunda División Profesional. He resigned on 1 June, and subsequently returned to his home country.

On 11 March 2022, Neme was named in charge of Huracán del Paso de la Arena, but was sacked on 25 July. On 8 August 2022, he replaced Leonel Rocco at the helm of Rentistas.

References

External links
 

1964 births
Living people
Footballers from Montevideo
Uruguayan footballers
Sud América players
Rampla Juniors players
C.A. Bella Vista players
Liverpool F.C. (Montevideo) players
Uruguayan football managers
C.A. Rentistas managers
Uruguayan expatriate football managers
Uruguayan expatriate sportspeople in Chile
Uruguayan expatriate sportspeople in Egypt